The 2016 California Democratic presidential primary was held on June 7 in the U.S. state of California as one of the Democratic Party's primaries ahead of the 2016 presidential election.

The Democratic Party's primaries in  Montana, New Jersey, New Mexico and South Dakota were held the same day, as were Republican primaries in the same five states. Additionally, the Democratic Party held North Dakota caucuses the same day.

Opinion polling

Results

Sanders won eight Congressional districts, including the Latino-heavy 34th district in Los Angeles, represented by Clinton supporter Rep. Xavier Becerra. In the 28th district the candidates were separated by just 67 votes, which covers the Los Angeles suburbs of Glendale and Burbank, and is represented by Rep. Adam Schiff.

Results by county

Analysis 
Clinton won the California primary, after Bernie Sanders had made a very serious play for the state and barnstormed it before election day. Sanders was significantly behind in the overall race by the time California voted (June 7, 2016), and it would have been hard for him to win the nomination by that point unless he persuaded Superdelegates to switch their support to him at the convention. He hoped a California win would assist in that effort. He rallied large numbers of supporters across the state, but in the end his barnstorming did not prevail, with Clinton winning by seven points (more than most polls predicted). She won in all the major cities: Sacramento, San Francisco, San Jose, Fresno, Los Angeles, and San Diego; Sanders did well in the northernmost counties bordering Oregon where he had won the month before. After Sanders' disappointing loss, Rose Kapolczynski, an advisor to Barbara Boxer, described the primary results: "You can have a lot of excitement and a compelling message and inspire people, but if they don’t show up to vote, it doesn’t matter. Sanders did have very impressive rallies all over the state, but were those people turning around and calling their neighbors and taking action to get other people to vote for Sanders?"

For her part, Clinton had campaigned aggressively for the state's diverse electorate, with Spanish, Korean, Vietnamese, Tagalog, and Chinese-language ads being aired by her campaign on the airwaves and on TV to make a play for both Latino and Asian American voters.

Clinton was declared the presumptive winner of the democratic nomination by multiple news outlets on June 6, the night before the California primary. She had previously not had enough delegates, and the declaration that she had clinched the nomination was based on a survey of superdelegates, not on votes. This announcement being made the night before a primary as large as California's was considered controversial, and may or may not have affected voter turnout the next day.

References

California
Democratic primary
2016